Westward Airways was a regional airline based in Scottsbluff, Nebraska. It ceased flight operations on July 25, 2005.

History 
The airline was established in 2002 and started operations on June 1, 2004, with flights on a Scottsbluff - North Platte - Kearney - Lincoln - Omaha route also known as "the river route". On November 30, 2004, a new operation was created in New Mexico linking Albuquerque with Alamogordo, Gallup, Las Cruces, and Taos. In early July 2005, Westward Airways halted services to Alamogordo and a few other cities. As the Albuquerque to Alamogordo route was subsidized under Essential Air Service, the airline was ordered to maintain operating this route. Flights were reinstated for a few more days but operations were stopped altogether on July 25, 2005.

Services 
Westward Airways operated services to the following scheduled domestic destinations: Lincoln, North Platte, Omaha, Scottsbluff, and Kearney. On April 5, 2005, new services were initiated at Albuquerque, Alamogordo, Gallup, Las Cruces, and Taos. Services were planned to Phoenix from both Gallup and Las Cruces but these routes never began.

Fleet 
 3 - Pilatus PC-12

See also 
 List of defunct airlines of the United States

References 

Defunct airlines of the United States
Airlines established in 2002
Airlines disestablished in 2005
Companies based in Nebraska
Scotts Bluff County, Nebraska
Defunct companies based in Nebraska
2002 establishments in Nebraska
2005 disestablishments in Nebraska